Kabadi Kabadi is a 2008 Indian Malayalam comedy film directed by the duo Sudheer Manu and starring Kalabhavan Mani, Mukesh, and Rambha.

Cast 
Kalabhavan Mani as Madhavankutty
Mukesh as Vijayan
Rambha as Sneha and Pooja
Saikumar
Suraj Venjaramoodu
Harisree Ashokan
Jagathy Sreekumar 
Mani C Kaappa
Bindu Panicker

Reception
Paresh C. Palicha of Rediff.com wrote that "All seen and suffered, this is one movie where its okay to give it a miss". A critic from Indiaglitz wrote that "All in all, this old fashioned movie can be a time pass for those who love to laugh even for hollow wits. 'Kabadi Kabadi' can be your film of the week, if you have got nothing much of any importance to do". A critic from Sify stated that "The old fashioned jokes, choreography and even the music are pointers that give a clear inkling about the problems with Kabadi Kabadi. That it has come out at least some twenty good years late".

References

2008 films
2000s Malayalam-language films